2 More Loves is an album released by 2moro. The album remains first, only and final full-length album through Rock Records.

The album features previously debut self-titled (or 雙胞胎的初回盤) EP, it contains five songs, as well as nine new songs.

Track listing

External links
 2 More Loves At Yesasia

2006 albums
2moro albums
Mandarin-language albums
Rock Records albums